Werner Kok (born 17 January 1993) is a South African rugby union player, currently playing with the South African Sevens team. His regular position is centre or winger.

Kok was a member of the South African Sevens team that won a bronze medal at the 2016 Summer Olympics.

Rugby career

Youth
At high school level, Kok represented the Pumas at the Under-16 2009 Grant Khomo Week and also at the Under-18 Craven Week tournament in 2011, where he scored a try in their match against Boland.

In 2012, Kok moved to Cape Town, where he represented the  side during the 2012 Under-19 Provincial Championship. He made eleven appearances for them in the competition.

South African Sevens

In 2013, Kok became involved with the South African Sevens side. He made his debut for them at the 2013 London Sevens, the final event of the 2012–13 IRB Sevens World Series. He didn't play in the 2013 Rugby World Cup Sevens in June 2013, but he did represent South Africa at the 2013 World Games in Cali, Colombia, where South Africa won the event, beating Argentina in the final.

Kok established himself as a regular for South Africa during the 2013–14 IRB Sevens World Series, including their wins at the 2013 South Africa Sevens and the 2014 USA Sevens. He was also included in their squad that played at the 2014 Commonwealth Games in Glasgow, helping his side all the way to the final, where they got a 17–12 victory over a New Zealand that won the previous four tournaments.

Kok was named the World Rugby Sevens Player of the Year for 2015 following his performances in the 2014–15 IRB Sevens World Series, where he was also the leading tackler in the series.

2016 Summer Olympics

Kok was included in a 12-man squad for the 2016 Summer Olympics in Rio de Janeiro. He was named as a substitute for their first match in Group B of the competition against Spain, with South Africa winning the match 24–0.

References

External links 
 
 
 
 
 

South African rugby union players
Living people
1993 births
People from Mbombela
Rugby union centres
Rugby union wings
South Africa international rugby sevens players
Rugby sevens players at the 2014 Commonwealth Games
Rugby sevens players at the 2018 Commonwealth Games
Commonwealth Games gold medallists for South Africa
Commonwealth Games rugby sevens players of South Africa
Rugby sevens players at the 2016 Summer Olympics
Olympic rugby sevens players of South Africa
Olympic bronze medalists for South Africa
Olympic medalists in rugby sevens
Medalists at the 2016 Summer Olympics
Commonwealth Games medallists in rugby sevens
Western Province (rugby union) players
World Games gold medalists
Competitors at the 2013 World Games
Stade Toulousain players
Sharks (rugby union) players
Sharks (Currie Cup) players
Medallists at the 2014 Commonwealth Games